State Route 828 (SR 828), also known as Farm District Road, is a  state highway and old alignment of U.S. Route 50 Alternate (US 50 Alt.; Lincoln Highway) between Fernley and Hazen.

Major intersections

References

828
Lincoln Highway
U.S. Route 50